The Gilbertese dancing, which is accompanied by singing, is a characteristic dance style of the Melanesians and the Polynesians.

It is a fusion of folk and ballad dance forms. Rhythm in the music is accentuated by beating with hand the upturned wooden boxes.

See also
 List of ethnic, regional, and folk dances by origin

References

Solomon Islands culture
Polynesian culture
Oceanian culture
Honiara